Hollywood is a large village predominantly located in the Bromsgrove district of Worcestershire, England, almost contiguous with and to the south of the city of Birmingham. Hollywood was formerly part of Kings Norton, but when Birmingham expanded in 1911, Hollywood remained in Worcestershire. The village now lies across the wards of Hollywood, most of Drakes Cross, the Trueman's Heath polling district area of Trueman's Heath parish ward and, following a 1966 border change, the southern portion of the Birmingham Highter's Heath ward, with all but the latter being located within the civil parish of Wythall. The southern part of the village is also known as Drakes Cross, whilst the eastern part is sometimes referred to as Trueman's Heath. Hollywood is situated in the extreme northeastern corner of Worcestershire, 8.5 miles / 13 km south of Birmingham city centre, 6 miles / 9.5 km west-southwest of Solihull and 8 miles / 12.5 km northeast of Redditch.

History
Until the 1950s, Hollywood was a rural area with many fields and farms. Extensive postwar development saw these fields and farms give way to housing estates, shops and schools. The majority of the development that took place was non-contiguous with the Birmingham conurbation: Hollywood Golf Course in particular ensured a break existed, as well as the retention of open fields directly south of the Maypole. However, in 1966, the city boundary moved from Maypole Lane to incorporate the latest contiguous developments on and directly off Maypole Lane, Alcester Road South and Highters Heath Lane, including the at the time soon to be built Hollywood Primary School. The naming of the school has primarily contributed to this part of Birmingham's Highter's Heath ward continuing to be associated with Hollywood.

Geography
Hollywood is served by the Alcester Road, although the A435 road itself which formerly ran through the village now bypasses it, and is adjacent to Highter's Heath to the north and Wythall to the south. Other settlements close by include Kings Heath, Kings Norton, Shirley, Tidbury Green, Earlswood, Major's Green, Whitlocks End and Dickens Heath.

Amenities

Hollywood is home to the 18-hole Hollywood Golf Club, formerly known as Gay Hill Golf Club since 1913, and a family owned and managed packaging company, Kilby Packaging, which has existed since 1946. Most of the village's community buildings are centred around Woodrush High School and the adjacent Coppice Primary School on Shawhurst Lane. These include the Woodrush Sports Centre, Community Hub and Wythall (parish) Library, whilst St Mary's CoE Church, originally located on Chapel Lane in Wythall, now occupies a new building adjoining the Coppice School. Hollywood Primary School is located just over the county border within the Highter's Heath ward of the city of Birmingham. The Packhorse public house is located on Alcester Road at the junction with May Lane.

Notable residents
Steve Ashley, former motor racing champion (Class 4 Kart, Formula Ford, F3).
Alan Dedicoat, former presenter at BBC Radio WM and now 'Voice of the Balls' on The National Lottery Draws, born in the village.
Chris Dunn (bass guitarist) from the band City Boy
Leslie Dunn (actor, compere, TV news journalist), known for playing Paul Johnson in The Archers
Parry Glasspool, Hollyoaks actor.
Alan Smith, former Arsenal and Leicester City striker.
John Taylor from the band Duran Duran.

References

Villages in Worcestershire